Sudden Sway were an English band from Peterborough, formed in 1980. They recorded two sessions for John Peel and released three albums before splitting up in the early 1990s.

History
The band was formed in 1980 by Mike McGuire (vocals) and Steve Rolls (guitar) after disbanding first generation punk band the Now. They recruited Pete Jostins (bass), Shaun Foreman (guitar/keyboards) and Colin Meech (drums), with various others contributing in their early days. They were initially influenced by fairly standard indie bands such as A Certain Ratio and Shriekback. Their first releases were two self-financed singles, "Jane's Third Party" and the To You, with Regard EP, in 1980 and 1981 respectively. The latter was recorded with the core line up of McGuire and Jostins plus new guitarist Simon Childs; this trio constituted the band on all further releases. Together with two well received John Peel radio seasons, they were sufficiently successful to attract major-label interest from CBS and Virgin Records. After a further single ("Traffic Tax Scheme") on their own Chant label, they signed a deal with Warner's subsidiary Blanco y Negro, debuting on the label in 1986 with eight versions of the single "Sing Song". After releasing the Spacemate package - a double LP, book, poster, set of cards and instruction manual, packaged together in a soap box container and designed by Jon Wozencroft, the band moved on to indie label Rough Trade Records, where they would stay for the rest of their career. Their fondness for short songs was evident on their first Rough Trade release, a 7-inch EP featuring eight, one minute songs and titled Autumn Cut Back Job Lot Offer, released in early 1987. The following year, they released their second album, '76 Kids Forever, which they described as a "soap opera musical". The band continued for one final effort, 1990's Ko-Opera album, a very different proposition as they utilized contemporary dance beats to deconstruct early '90s consumerism. This was to be their swan song with the band splitting up soon after, with an unheard and unreleased album (minus Simon Childs) in the can.

The band recorded two sessions for John Peel's BBC Radio 1 programme, in 1983 ("Let's Evolve", "Relationships") and 1984 ("A Walk in the Park", "Problem-Solving Broadcasts 1-3", "T Minus Tranquility"); the first released as an EP in 1986. They also made an appearance on Whistle Test, performing "Packet of Vacuum", "Father I Do" and “Gary Guerilla, Household Militia, plus an appearance on C4's Night Network, playing "Solo Store Detective Man".

Discography

Albums
Spacemate double-LP (1986), Blanco y Negro BYN8B
'76 Kids Forever (1988), Rough Trade
Ko-Opera (1990), Rough Trade

Singles
"Jane's Third Party" b/w "Don't Go" (1980), Chant 1A
To You, with Regard - 12" EP (1981), Chant EJSP9692
"The Traffic Tax Scheme" - 7" single with 2 songs and computer program (1984), Chant SRTS 82 CUS 1592
Sing Song V1-V8 - eight different versions of the same song (1986), Blanco y Negro NEG18
Peel Session 16.11.83 EP (1986), Strange Fruit (UK Indie #17)
Autumn Cutback Job Lot Offer EP (1987), Rough Trade RT183
Sat'day Mornin Episode EP (1987), Rough Trade RTT213 (12" only)

Compilation appearances
"Fatherized" (1985) on Sounds Christmas Cracker EP

References

External links
Sudden Sway on Myspace
Pinsent, Ed (1997) "Maladroit Rhythms", The Sound Projector, Issue #2

English pop music groups
English new wave musical groups
Musical groups established in 1980
Musical groups from Cambridgeshire
Blanco y Negro Records artists
Rough Trade Records artists